The Central Highlands is a region in Tasmania, Australia where geographical and administrative boundaries closely coincide.  It is also known as The Lake Country of Tasmania.

Geographical region

The mountains of Central Tasmania are mainly found in four different conservation reserves:

 Cradle Mountain-Lake St Clair National Park - in the western part
 Walls of Jerusalem National Park - in the central part
 Central Plateau Conservation Area in the eastern part

Administrative region
The Central Highlands Council incorporates most of the highland region.

Former Hydro communities
Early power developments by Hydro Tasmania in the Central Highlands included the communities of workers who were employed in construction. Significant numbers of the communities were migrants to Australia

The Tarraleah community was one established in 1934 which was a significant early community for the Upper Derwent Power Development.  The part of Tarraleah known as Ticklebelly Flat - the area of the married quarters of the community - has become a part of Hydro history, being utilised in the most comprehensive history of the Hydro to date, Heather Fenton's book Ticklebelly Tales.

Fishing
The Central Highlands of Tasmania are home to famous trout fishing lakes and boasts some of the best trout fly fishing found anywhere in the world. The location played host to the 2019 World Fly Fishing Championships. The Central Highlands are on the bucket list for many fly fisherman with popular locations including Great Lake, Arthurs Lake, Woods Lake and Pinestock Lagoon.

Tasmania heartland
The combined councils of the Central Highlands and the two Midlands councils - the southern and the northern have had for almost a decade a web based portal which combines the areas to a name of Tasmanian heartland. The Central Highlands Council has been organising the annual Bushfest which includes various outdoor activities such as fishing, camping, hunting and adventure sports. The event started in 2014 and witnesses a gathering of nearly 4000 people every year.

Lakes
Many lakes are found in the Central Highlands - giving the region the tourist feature of the 'Lakes Region'; they include:

 Arthurs Lake
 Bradys Lake
 Bronte Lagoon
 Great Lake
 Lagoon of Islands
 Lake Augusta
 Lake Binney
 Lake Crescent
 Lake Echo
 Lake King William
 Lake Sorell
 Little Pine Lagoon

See also

Midlands (Tasmania)

References

Further reading
 Cullen, Philip J.(1995) Land degradation on the Central Plateau, Tasmania : the legacy of 170 years of exploitation Hobart, Tas. : Earth Science Section, Parks and Wildlife Service, Dept. of Environment and Land Management.   Occasional paper (Tasmania. Parks and Wildlife Service) ; no. 34.
 Jetson, Tim.(1989) The roof of Tasmania: a history of the Central Plateau  Launceston, Tas.: Pelion Press. 
 McKenny, Helen. (2000) A guide to vegetation management issues in the Central Plateau region, Tasmania Hobart, Tas. Dept. of Primary Industries, Water and Environment, 

 
Highlands